Toyota South Africa Motors (Proprietary) Limited (TSAM) is an automobile manufacturer that is a subsidiary of Toyota based in Prospecton, South Africa.

History
In 1959, the first Toyota model, a Land Cruiser, was exported to South Africa, followed two years later by ten units of the Stout.

Production of Toyota models at Motor Assemblies began in 1962 or 1963. At the end of 1964, the sales organisation Toyota SA, which had been founded three years earlier, took over the majority of Motor Assemblies.

In 1978, TSAM finally acquired 100% of the shares in Motor Assemblies.

The Japanese Toyota Motor Corporation initially acquired 27.8% of the shares in TSAM in 1996, increased this share to 75% in 2002 and finally to 100% in 2009.

In 2006, Toyota SA surpassed BMW South Africa as the country's largest automobile exporter.

In 2014, Toyota had 8,500 employees in South Africa.

Models
At Motor Assemblies, Toyota platform trucks such as the Toyopet Stout were initially produced. From 1966, the Corona was also produced, which is the first passenger car produced under the Toyota brand. In November 1966, the engine production began.

The Hilux has been manufactured in South Africa since 1970, and Hino commercial vehicles have also been produced since 1974. In May 1975, the production of the Corolla began.

The following models manufactured by TSAM are also exported: the Corolla to Australia since 2003 and Europe since 2007 and the Hilux bakkie to Europe and the rest of Africa since 2005.

With the Toyota Conquest or Tazz, TSAM followed a similar approach (long construction time of an outdated model, relatively little model maintenance) to Volkswagen with the Citi Golf and Nissan South Africa with the Nissan 1400. The model was sold as the Conquest from 1986 and the Tazz from 1996 to 2006. But from 1996 to 2006, 207,169 units of the TSAM Tazz have been sold and it was the market leader in its class in this period of eight out of eleven years. Successors of the smaller Tazz are the Aygo and the Etios.

The one millionth Corolla was manufactured in South Africa in 2013.

In 2014, the Hilux, Fortuner, all Hino models and Ses'fikile taxis were produced from kits at the Toyota plant in Prospecton near Durban.

In Q4 2021, Toyota started assembling the Corolla Cross in South Africa.

References

External links 
 

Toyota
Car manufacturers of South Africa
Companies based in KwaZulu-Natal
Vehicle manufacturing companies established in 1961
1961 establishments in South Africa
South African subsidiaries of foreign companies
eThekwini Metropolitan Municipality